The 1987–88 Gamma Ethniki was the fifth season since the official establishment of the third tier of Greek football in 1983. Atromitos and Makedonikos were crowned champions in Southern and Northern Group respectively, thus winning promotion to Beta Ethniki. Rethymniakos and Niki Volos also won promotion as a runners-up of the groups.

Panargiakos, Kerkyra, Rodos, Ergotelis, Aiolikos Aris Nikaia, Achaiki, Messiniakos, Agrotikos Asteras, Lamia, Panetolikos, Polykastro, Olympiakos Chalkida, Ethnikos Alexandroupoli, Anagennisi Neapoli, Pandramaikos, Anagennisi Kolindros, Alexandreia and Nestos Chrysoupoli were relegated to Delta Ethniki.

Southern Group

League table

Northern Group

League table

References

Third level Greek football league seasons
3
Greece